The yellow-throated flycatcher (Conopias parvus) is a species of bird in the family Tyrannidae.
It is found in Bolivia, Brazil, Colombia, Ecuador, French Guiana, Guyana, Peru, Suriname, and Venezuela.
Its natural habitat is subtropical or tropical moist lowland forests.

Description 
The bird is similar to the great kiskadee, but behavior and voice is quite different. The voice is quite vocal; often-heard call is a distinctive hollow rattle with a thrumming tune. It is 6.1 inches in length.

References

yellow-throated flycatcher
Birds of the Amazon Basin
Birds of the Guianas
yellow-throated flycatcher
yellow-throated flycatcher
Taxonomy articles created by Polbot